The 2023 Badminton Asia Mixed Team Championships were the third edition of the Badminton Asia Mixed Team Championships which was held at the Dubai Exhibition Centre in United Arab Emirates from 14 to 19 February 2023. It was organised by Badminton Asia and United Arab Emirates Badminton Federation. The event was also known as the Badminton Asia Mixed Team Championships 2023.

Medalists

Tournaments
The 2023 Badminton Asia Mixed Team Championships (also known as the Tong Yun Kai Cup 2023) are the third edition of the Badminton Asia Mixed Team Championships, a continental badminton tournament to crown the best mixed national badminton teams in Asia. The tournament was held with 17 teams at the Dubai Exhibition Centre in Dubai, United Arab Emirates, from 14 to 19 February 2023. Team China is the defending champion.

Venue
The tournament will be held at Dubai Exhibition Centre in Dubai, United Arab Emirates.

Seeds
The seeding are as followed:

Draw
The draw was held on 31 January 2023. The group stage consisted of one group with five teams and three groups each with four teams. The first seeded team, China, was preassigned to Group A, while the second seeded team, Japan, was preassigned to Group D.

Squads

Group stage

Group A

South Korea vs Singapore

China vs Uzbekistan

China vs Singapore

South Korea vs Uzbekistan

China vs South Korea

Singapore vs Uzbekistan

Group B

Malaysia vs United Arab Emirates

India vs Kazakhstan

India vs United Arab Emirates

Malaysia vs Kazakhstan

Malaysia vs India

Kazakhstan vs United Arab Emirates

Group C

Indonesia vs Lebanon

Thailand vs Syria

Bahrain vs Lebanon

Indonesia vs Syria

Indonesia vs Bahrain

Thailand vs Lebanon

Thailand vs Bahrain

Syria vs Lebanon

Indonesia vs Thailand

Bahrain vs Syria

Group D

Chinese Taipei vs Hong Kong

Japan vs Pakistan

Japan vs Hong Kong

Chinese Taipei vs Pakistan

Japan vs Chinese Taipei

Hong Kong vs Pakistan

Knockout stage

Quarter-finals

South Korea vs Indonesia

Thailand vs Japan

India vs Hong Kong

China vs Malaysia

Semi-finals

South Korea vs Thailand

China vs India

Final

China vs South Korea

Final ranking

References

External links
 Badminton Asia Mixed Team Championship 2023

 
Asia Champ
2023 in Emirati sport
Badminton Asia Team Championships
Badminton Asia Mixed Team Championships
Asia
Badminton Asia Team Championships